Haruna Mshelia  is a Nigerian medical doctor and politician representing Hawul/Askira Uba federal constituency of Borno State, Nigeria.

References 

People from Borno State
Living people
Year of birth missing (living people)